Mavulis Island is the northernmost of the Batanes Islands and the northernmost island in the Philippines. It is part of the province of Batanes. The island is uninhabited but it is guarded by the military. It is also frequently visited by local fishermen (mostly from Itbayat and Basco) for fishing adventures.

The island has a newly constructed military and fishermen shelter, a water desalination plant, a helipad, lighthouse, and a flagpole on the top of the hill in the island.

The island also hosts the northernmost flagpole in the country.

Alternative names
Older Batan natives also called the island Dimavulis or Dihami, meaning "north" in Ivatan. By some members of the Spanish colonial government it was called Diami, and it is known as Yami or Y'Ami on most American Colonial Era maps of the Philippines. The latter should not be confused with the aboriginal Yami of Taiwan that live on islands farther north beyond Philippine territorial limits, but are geographically, culturally and linguistically related to the Ivatan people. The island is also called Amianan, meaning "north" in Ilocano.

Geography

The island is rocky on the coasts but covered in lush vegetation, including mangrove, vuyavuy palms and other native shrubs. Coconut crabs are found  on the island in large numbers.

Development
The Armed Forces of the Philippines Northern Luzon Command in 2016 has pushed for the establishment of a Marine detachment on Mavulis Island to affirm the Philippines' sovereignty on the northernmost point of the archipelago. The Marine detachment was opened in 2018, with a fisherman's shelter completed in 2019 and turned over to the local municipality for maintenance and operation.

In May 2021, the Department of Defense of the Philippines announced the electrification of the island through a solar power station, with a back-up diesel generator. This was done through the help of the One Meralco Foundation. The DND also announced the commissioning of a desalination plant to provide potable water to personnel assigned to the island.

Gallery

See also

 Extreme points of the Philippines
 Desert island
 List of islands

References

 University of Georgia - a webpage on the Yami of Taiwan

Islands of Batanes
Uninhabited islands of the Philippines